Saba may refer to:

Places
 Saba (island), an island of the Netherlands located in the Caribbean Sea
 Şaba (Romanian for Shabo), a town of the Odesa Oblast, Ukraine
 Sabá, a municipality in the department of Colón, Honduras 
 Saba (river), Leningrad Oblast, Russia
 Saba, Iran, a village in Bushehr Province
 Saba District, Yamaguchi, district located in Yamaguchi Prefecture, Japan
 Saba Island, United States Virgin Islands, an island three miles south of St. Thomas
 Saba Bank, the largest submarine atoll in the Atlantic Ocean, located in the Caribbean Netherlands 
 Saba Rock, a small island in the British Virgin Islands
 Mukim Saba, a mukim in Brunei
 Kfar Saba, a city in Israel
 Kafr Saba, a historical village in Mandatory Palestine

History
 Sabaʾ, an ancient kingdom in South Arabia
 Saba' (Sheba), an ancient kingdom mentioned in Biblical and Islamic traditions which may be the same as Sabaʾ

People
 Saba (name), a given or surname (includes list of people with the name)
 Saba or Sabbas the Goth (334–372), Christian saint
 Saba or Sabbas the Sanctified (439–532), Christian saint
 Saba (rapper) (born 1994), American rapper and record producer

Organizations
 Saba & Co. IP, an intellectual property firm active in Middle East and Africa
 SABA (electronics manufacturer), German electronics company and jazz record label, became MPS Records
 Saba TV Network, an Afghan satellite television networking two channels
 SABA (clothing), an up-market clothing brand sold in Australia
 Saba (car), an Iranian car model based on the Kia Motors Pride design
 SABA (hygiene products), Norwegian hygiene products company, became Essity
 Saba Capital Management, American hedge fund managed by Boaz Weinstein 
 Saba Petroleum, a private U.S. oil and gas company, mainly operating in southern and central California
 Saba News Agency, official Yemeni government news agency
 Saba University School of Medicine, located on the island of Saba, Netherlands
 SABA or Sacramento Area Bicycle Advocates, an organization in Sacramento, California
 SABA Women's Championship, a basketball tournament organized by the South Asia Basketball Association

Plants
 Saba banana, a variety of banana originating in the Philippines
 Saba (plant), a genus in family Apocynaceae native to Africa and Indian Ocean islands
 Saba nut, the name of two species in the family Malvaceae native to Central and South America:
 Pachira aquatica
 Pachira glabra

Other uses
 Saba (sura), a chapter of the Qur'an
 Saba (music), a scale in Arabic and Turkish music
 "Saba", a ska song by Mephiskapheles
Saba (condiment), a typical condiment used in parts of Italy
 British Aerospace P.1233-1 Saba, a proposed military aircraft
 Saba Saba Day, a remembrance day in Tanzania and Kenya
 "Saba the Bird", a poem by Patti Smith from the 1978 book Babel
 Saba Sebatyne, a New Order Jedi character in the Star Wars Expanded Universe
Short-acting β-agonist, a class of drug primarily used to treat asthma and other pulmonary disorders
 Saba, a way of referring to mackerel as food

See also
Sabah (disambiguation)
Sabbas (disambiguation)
Sabians, a religious group mentioned in the Quran